Log pri Mlinšah is a settlement southwest of Izlake in the Municipality of Zagorje ob Savi in central Slovenia. The area is part of the traditional region of Upper Carniola. It is now included with the rest of the municipality in the Central Sava Statistical Region.

Name
The name of the settlement was changed from Log to Log pri Mlinšah in 1955.

References

External links

Log pri Mlinšah on Geopedia

Populated places in the Municipality of Zagorje ob Savi